Tilomar, officially Tilomar Administrative Post, is an administrative post (and was formerly a subdistrict) in Cova Lima municipality, East Timor. Its seat or administrative centre is Casabauc.

The administrative post has an area of 194,64 km2 and 7,043 inhabitants (2010). Most spoken language is Tetum Terik, but there is a big Bunak minority, too. Tilomar is divided into four sucos: Beiseuc, Casabauc, Lalawa, and Maudemo.

59% of the households in Tilomar are producing corn, 58% maniok, 53% vegetables, 48% coconuts, 15% rice and 8% coffee.

References

External links 

  – information page on Ministry of State Administration site 

Administrative posts of East Timor
Cova Lima Municipality